Kügelgen was the surname of a family of famous German painters:

 Gerhard von Kügelgen (1772–1820), German painter, active in early romanticism, famous for his portraits and historical paintings
 Karl von Kügelgen (1772–1832), German painter, Gerhard's twin brother
 Wilhelm von Kügelgen (1802–1867), German painter, Gerhard's son
 Konstantin von Kügelgen (1810–1880), German painter, Karl's son

See also
 11313 Kügelgen, an asteroid named after Gerhard

de:Kügelgen